Kenji Comes Home is a 1949 documentary film produced by Paul F. Heard. Written and directed by Charles F. Schwep, it was filmed on location in Japan and employed native actors. The film was nominated for an Academy Award for Best Documentary Feature.

References

External links

1949 films
1949 documentary films
American documentary films
American black-and-white films
Black-and-white documentary films
Films shot in Japan
1940s English-language films
1940s American films